Ploieşti metropolitan area is a proposed metropolitan area project, launched in 2003.

It will be formed from Ploieşti municipality and surrounding communities: Ariceștii Rahtivani, Bărcăneşti, Berceni, Blejoi, Brazi, Bucov, Păuleşti and Târgșoru Vechi.

As defined by Eurostat, the Ploiești functional urban area has a population of 294,468 residents.

References

Metropolitan areas of Romania
Geography of Prahova County